Gueule Tapée-Fass-Colobane is a commune d'arrondissement of the city of Dakar, Senegal. As of 2013 it had a population of 52,270.

Notable people
Djibril Diop Mambéty (1945-1998) - film director

References

Arrondissements of Dakar